Nothing Sacred is a novel by Boris Akunin, the second part of the fourth book on the adventures of Russian and German spies during the First World War. It describes the new confrontation of Aleksey Romanov and Joseph von Teofels in the autumn of 1916.

Plot 
In November 1916 the German high command, after the heavy defeats suffered by its ally the Austro-Hungarian Empire, concluded that a military victory over Russia  is impossible. One of their best spies, Josef von Theofels (known as Sepp), suggests a proven method which had been  used by Japanese intelligence in 1905. Consequently, the Japanese provoke a revolution in Russia by generously financing Lenin and his party, because they foresee an early defeat in the war.

The chief of German intelligence rejects Sepp's plan, and offers his own — the assassination of Nicholas II, expecting that the emperor's death would cause confusion and a struggle for power that would drive Russia out of the war. Wilhelm II, who is Nikolai's cousin, would never allow such an operation, and so Theofels must kill the Tsar by making it look like an accident, deciding to engineer a rail accident. Sepp assembles a group of militant nationalists who hate Nicholas II. At the same time, Duke Kozlovsky the Russian chief of counterintelligence sends his best agent, Aleksei Romanov, to the front  to examine how well the security of  "train number 1", in which the Emperor Nicholas II  travels along the front, is organized. Romanov discovers that the retinue of Nicholas includes a traitor who informs German intelligence of all the movements of the royal train. Aleksei discerns a possible assassination attempt and begins to act, seeking to prevent the murder of the Tsar....now read on

References

2010 novels
Novels by Boris Akunin
Russian mystery novels
Historical mystery novels
Detective novels
Russian spy novels
21st-century Russian novels
Russian historical novels
Russian detective novels
Novels set during World War I